Riccardo Divora (22 December 1908 – 10 January 1951) was an Italian rower who competed in the 1932 Summer Olympics.

In 1932 he won the silver medal as member of the Italian boat in the coxed fours competition.

External links
 profile

1908 births
1951 deaths
Italian male rowers
Olympic rowers of Italy
Rowers at the 1932 Summer Olympics
Olympic silver medalists for Italy
Olympic medalists in rowing
Medalists at the 1932 Summer Olympics